The Strategic Sealift Officer Program, previously known as the Merchant Marine Reserve and founded in 1913 as the Naval Auxiliary Reserve, consists of members of the United States Merchant Marine who are also members of the United States Navy. Officers in the Merchant Marine Reserve are entitled to wear the Strategic Sealift Officer Warfare Insignia.

The program was called Merchant Marine Naval Reserve from 1925 to 1938 and Merchant Marine Reserve from 1938 to 2010.

References

External links
Strategic Sealift Midshipman Program (SSMP)
DoD Investigation into Military Sealift Readiness

United States Navy Reserve
United States Merchant Marine